Enn Sarv (13 May 1921 – 22 March 2008) was an Estonian freedom fighter.

In 2006 he was awarded the Order of the White Star, II class.

He was honorary alumnus of the Estonian Students' Society.

Books
 Õiguse vastu ei saa ükski. Eesti taotlused ja rahvusvaheline õigus. Okupatsioonide repressiivpoliitika uurimise riiklik komisjon. Tartu, 1997.
 EV kontinuiteet 1940–1945. [Tallinn: Kistler-Ritso Fond, 2003?]
 Õiguse ja vabaduse vahimehed: Heinrich Marga ja Enn Sarve kirjavahetus 1994–2003. Tallinn: Grenader, 2012.

References

1921 births
2008 deaths
Estonian independence activists
Recipients of the Order of the White Star, 2nd Class